The 2019 Marvellous 12  was a qualifying event organized by the Chinese Table Tennis Association, Tencent Sports and Shenzhen Municipal Culture, Sports and Tourism Bureau. It will be held in Shenzhen, China from 28 February to 3 March, 2019. It was the second edition of the tournament, and the second time that it have been held in Shenzhen. Winners and runners-up of the men's and women's singles event, namely Fan Zhendong, Liang Jingkun, Chen Meng, and Sun Yingsha, was each guaranteed a spot to represent China in the 2019 World Table Tennis Championships.

Format and participants
Six top ranked men and women players in China automatically qualify to the events. Six additional players to each event were decided in a closed competition held from 12 to 17 February. Twelve players in each event compete in a Round-Robin format. The winners of each event qualify to the single's event of the World Championships, while the runners-up are each guaranteed a spot in the team's final squad.

Men's singles

 Ma Long (withdrew due to injury)
 Fan Zhendong
 Xu Xin
 Wang Chuqin
 Lin Gaoyuan
 Liang Jingkun
 Fang Bo
 Xu Chenhao
 Zhou Kai
 Zhao Zihao
 Yu Ziyang
 Xue Fei
 Yan An (replaced Ma Long)

Women's singles

 Ding Ning
 Liu Shiwen
 Zhu Yuling
 Chen Meng
 Wang Manyu
 Wu Yang
 Gu Yuting
 Sun Yingsha
 Wang Yidi
 Sun Mingyang
 He Zhuojia
 Chen Xingtong

Events

Men's singles

Women's singles

References

External links
Official website

Marvellous 12
2019 in Chinese sport
Table tennis competitions in China
Marvellous 12
Marvellous 12